A. L. Burbank & Company, Ltd. of New York City was a shipping company founded by Abram Lincoln Burbank on October 16, 1928.  A. L. Burbank & Company, Ltd. operated dry bulk cargo ships.  Abram Lincoln Burbank worked for and learned the shipping trade at Bull lines of the A. H. Bull Steamship Company in 1917. 

Peter Burbank, Abram Lincoln Burbank son, took over the company as president in 1955. In October 1978 Franklin W.L. Tsao became president of the company, in a 50 year anniversary celebration. Tsao has worked at the company since 1968 

A. L. Burbank & Company, Ltd. was active with charter shipping with the Maritime Commission and War Shipping Administration. During wartime, the A. L. Burbank & Company, Ltd. operated Liberty ships. The ship was run by its A. L. Burbank & Company, Ltd. and the US Navy supplied United States Navy Armed Guards to man the deck guns and radio. The most common armament mounted on these merchant ships were the MK II 20mm Oerlikon autocannon and the 3"/50, 4"/50, and 5"/38 deck guns. 

A. L. Burbank & Company, Ltd closed in 2014.

Ships
Ships:
A. L. Burbank & Company, Ltd. operated ships"
Coastal Stevedore a type C1 cargo ship
Liberty Ships:
SS Edward M. House
SS Henry B. Plant
SS Howard A. Kelly
C. Francis Jenkins 
Carter Braxton 
Amasa Delano 
Anson Jones  
Earl A.Bloomquist 		
Edward M.House 	 	
SS Booker T. Washington
SS Benjamin H. Hill
SS Cornelia P. Spencer

See also

Calmar Steamship Company
Bethlehem Transportation Corporation
World War II United States Merchant Navy

References 

Defunct shipping companies of the United States
Transport companies established in 1928
American companies established in 1928
1928 establishments in New York (state)